Aleksandr Gerasimov may refer to:
 Aleksandr Gerasimov (painter) (1881–1963), Russian painter
 Aleksandr Gerasimov (footballer) (born 1969), Russian footballer
 Aleksandr Gerasimov (volleyball) (born 1975), Russian volleyball player
 Aleksandr Gerasimov (military musician) (born 1962), Russian military musician and Director of the Moscow Military Music College.
 Alexander Gerasimov (ice hockey) (1959–2020), Russian ice hockey player